Manuel Menéndez Gorozabel (1793 – May 2, 1847) was a Peruvian politician who served as President of Peru from 1841 to 1842, and again from 1844 to 1845.

See also
 List of presidents of Peru

1793 births
1847 deaths
Presidents of Peru